Włodzimierz Zdzisław Olszewski (born January 12, 1956) is a former Polish ice hockey goaltender. He played for the Poland men's national ice hockey team at the 1984 Winter Olympics in Sarajevo.

References

1956 births
Living people
Ice hockey players at the 1984 Winter Olympics
Olympic ice hockey players of Poland
Polish ice hockey goaltenders
Sportspeople from Gdańsk